The Okeechobee Music and Arts Festival (commonly referred to as Okeechobee) is an annual four-day music and arts festival. It is held at the 600-acre Sunshine Grove property in Okeechobee, Florida.

History
The first Okeechobee Music and Arts Festival was held March 4–6, 2016. With artists such as Bassnectar, Skrillex, Kendrick Lamar, and Mumford & Sons, the festival drew around 32,000 attendees in its first year. The festival is produced by Soundslinger, LLC, an independent company founded by Steve Sybesma, formerly of Sunshine Promotions, Paul Peck formerly of Superfly (Bonnaroo Music Festival), and a team of producers who have presented other major festivals and concerts around the globe. It was announced in late 2016 that both Sybesma and Peck would be leaving the company on good terms, and Kevin Collinsworth was appointed CEO. Soundslinger is headquartered in Miami, with offices in New York City.

After announcing in November 2018 that it would go on hiatus, EDM promoter Insomniac acquired a controlling stake in Soundslinger in June 2019. The festival returned in 2020 with an upgraded production and redesigned stages more in line with its other events, while maintaining the existing mix of genres.

Festival summary by year

References

Music festivals in Florida
Tourist attractions in Okeechobee County, Florida
2016 establishments in Florida
Music festivals established in 2016